Bedevilled (lit. "The Whole Story of the Kim Bok-nam Murder Case") is a 2010 South Korean horror film starring Seo Young-hee and Ji Sung-won. The film premiered as an official selection of International Critics' Week at the 2010 Cannes Film Festival.

It is the feature directorial debut of Jang Cheol-soo, who worked as an assistant director on the Kim Ki-duk films Samaritan Girl and Spring, Summer, Fall, Winter... and Spring. The film was a runaway hit in Korea, with the box-office returns far exceeding its  budget.

Plot
Hae-won works in a Seoul bank. A stern, tense woman, her work status and hyper competitive mentality make her apathetic to the plight of other people. After witnessing violence against a woman resulting in the death of the victim, she refuses to identify the culprit because it's not her problem, even after the offender tries to sexually harass her. In the office, she is accidentally locked in the toilet by the janitor and assumes it's one of her co-workers pranking her. She slaps her co-worker in public, realizing she is wrong right after. These incidents cause her boss to fire her. Hae-won takes up a friend's offer to take a vacation in Mudo, a desolate and socially-backward Southern island where she spent her childhood.

At the island, she is warmly welcomed by Bok-nam, with whom she had a close friendship when they were teenagers, but whose constant letters she's since ignored. Life on the undeveloped regressive island is hard, and Bok-nam is treated as little more than a slave by her abusive husband Man-jong, his lustful brother, and the local mean women. Bok-nam's love is reserved for her young daughter Yeon-hee, with whom she tries to escape for a better life. Man-jong is secretly making Yeon-hee into a sexual object for his own sick pleasure much to Bok-man's rage. Her daughter is accidentally killed after she tries to defend her mother against Man-Jong. Bok-nam cries and reveals that Yeon-Hee may not be his daughter as Bok-nam was raped by many men on the island before. In a flashback, it's revealed that Hae-won was teaching Bok-nam how to play a tune on her recorder when four local boys on the island began harassing them. Hae-won fled and witnessed the boys assault the knocked-out Bok-nam. 

The locals lie to police when questioned about the death of Yeon-hee and Hae-won does not support Bok-nam. Bok-nam finally snaps and kills anyone she finds, armed with a sickle. After murdering three mean old women, she chases her mother-in-law to the cliff. The old woman tries to jump into the sea but lands on the rock, killing herself. Bok-nam then decapitates her brother-in-law. Man-jong decides to kill Bok-nam, causing Hae-won to snap out of her apathy and threaten to call the police. Eventually, Bok-nam brutally finishes off Man-jong. Terrified, Hae-won runs to the boat to escape but Bok-nam catches up and drowns the boat driver for letting her husband keep abusing her, leaving Hae-won to escape to the mainland. 

Bok-nam travels to Seoul with the recorder from their childhood and tries to kill Hae-won in police custody because she refused to help her or her daughter. It is revealed that Hae-won did witness Yeon-hee's murder and had lied to the investigator about being asleep. A policeman shoots Bok-nam multiple times. Bok-nam kills him with a sledgehammer. Hae-won kills Bok-nam with the broken recorder; she dies in Hae-won's lap. On the island, all the murdered victims have been buried and cremated by Bok-nam, leaving the island void of human life.

Traumatized and guilt-ridden, Hae-won realizes the repercussion of her apathy and points out the culprits of the sexual assault she'd witnessed to the police. She takes Bok-nam's letters out of the trashcan and reads them, regretting not helping Bok-nam when she had the chance.

Cast

Main characters 
 Seo Young-hee – Kim Bok-nam
 Ji Sung-won – Hae-won
 Park Jeong-hak – Man-jong
 Baek Su-ryun – Dong-ho's granny
 Bae Sung-woo – Cheol-jong
 Oh Yong – Deuk-su
 Lee Ji-eun – Kim Yeon-hee
 Kim Gyeong-ae – Pa-ju's granny
 Son Yeong-sun – Sun-yi's granny
 Lee Myeong-ja – Gae-tong's granny
 Yu Sun-cheol – Old man with Alzheimer's
 Jo Deok-jae – Police officer Seo
 Chae Shi-hyeon – Mi-ran

Supporting characters 

 Tak Seong-eun – Ji-su
 Hong Seung-jin – Yankee's
 Hwang Min-ho – Dodger's
 Hong Jae-seong – Police officer Jang
 Jeong Gi-seob – Officer Choi
 Ahn Jang-hun – Mr. Jang
 Myeong Ro-jin – Bank manager
 Kim Gyeong-ran – Old lady at bank
 Jae Min – Victim
 Park Jeong-sun – Victim's father
 Seong Won-yong – Supervisor
 Han Dong-hak – Superintendent
 Yuk Sae-jin – Mudo policeman
 Shim Seung-hyeon – Mudo policeman
 Kim Yong – Seoul policeman
 Yu Seung-oh – Seoul policeman
 Na Jong-ho – Old villager
 Hang Hae-ji – Old villager's daughter
 Yu Ae-jin – Young Bok-nam
 Chun Yeong-min – Young Hae-won
 Park Jong-bin – Young Man-jong
 Lee Da-un – Young Cheol-jong
 Park Seung-ah – Young Deok-su
 Kim Woo-seok – Young Seo
 Seo Seung-hwa – Banker
 Kim Hyeon-su – Banker
 Lee Kang-hee – Tearoom waitress
 Ahn Su-yeon – Restaurant waitress
 Kim Woo-geun – Coupon boy

Awards 
2010 Puchon International Fantastic Film Festival 
 Best of Puchon
 Best Actress – Seo Young-hee
 Fujifilm Eterna Award

2010 Cinema Digital Seoul Film Festival 
 Butterfly Award

2010 Fantastic Fest 
 Audience Award
 Best Actress AMD & Dell "Next Wave" Spotlight Competition – Seo Young-hee

2010 AFI Fest 
 New Auteurs

2010 Grand Bell Awards 
 Best New Director – Jang Cheol-soo

2010 Korean Association of Film Critics Awards
 Best Actress – Seo Young-hee
 Best New Director – Jang Cheol-soo

2010 Korean Film Awards  
 Best Actress – Seo Young-hee
 Best New Director – Jang Cheol-soo

2010 Director's Cut Awards
 Best Actress – Seo Young-hee
 Best New Director – Jang Cheol-soo

2011 KOFRA Film Awards (Korea Film Reporters Association) 	
 Best Actress – Seo Young-hee

2011 Gerardmer International Fantastic Film Festival
 Grand Prix

2011 Fantasporto Oporto International Film Festival  
 Best Actress – Seo Young-hee

2011 Imagine: Amsterdam Fantastic Film Festival 
 Black Tulip (Grand Jury Prize)

2011 Golden Cinematography Awards
 Best Film
 Best New Actress – Ji Sung-won
 Bronze Medal Cinematography – Kim Gi-tae

References

External links 
  
 Bedevilled at Finecut
 
 
 
 

2010 films
2010 horror films
2010 horror thriller films
South Korean horror thriller films
Sponge Entertainment films
2010s Korean-language films
Incest in film
Splatter films
Rape and revenge films
Films about child sexual abuse
Films set on islands
South Korean films about revenge
Films directed by Jang Cheol-soo
2010s South Korean films